National Highway 248A, commonly called NH 248A is a national highway in  India. It is a spur road of National Highway 48. NH-248A traverses the states of Rajasthan and Haryana in India.

Route 
Sahpura - Alwar - Ramgarh - Nuh - Gurgaon.

Junctions  
 
  Terminal near Sahpura.
 KMP Expressway T interchange, south-west of Sohna.
  near Sohna.
  Terminal near Gurgaon.

See also 
 List of National Highways in India
 List of National Highways in India by state

References

External links 

 NH 248A on OpenStreetMap

National highways in India
National Highways in Rajasthan
National Highways in Haryana